Annabelle is an allegedly haunted Raggedy Ann doll, housed in the (now closed) occult museum of the paranormal investigators Ed and Lorraine Warren. Annabelle was moved there after supposed hauntings in 1970. A character based on the doll is one of the antagonists that appear in the Conjuring Universe.

Background 
According to the Warrens, a student nurse was given the doll in 1971. They said that the doll behaved strangely, and that a psychic medium told the student that the doll was inhabited by the spirit of a deceased girl named "Annabelle". The student and her roommate tried to accept and nurture the spirit-possessed doll, but the doll reportedly exhibited malicious and frightening behavior. It was at this point that the Warrens say they were first contacted, moving the doll to their museum after pronouncing it demonically possessed. The doll remained in a glass box at The Warrens' Occult Museum in Monroe, Connecticut until the museum's closing.

Texas State University assistant professor of religious studies Joseph Laycock says most skeptics have dismissed the Warrens' museum as "full of off-the-shelf Halloween junk, dolls and toys, books you could buy at any bookstore". Laycock calls the Annabelle legend an "interesting case study in the relationship between pop culture and paranormal folklore" and speculates that the demonic doll trope popularized by films such as Child's Play, Dolly Dearest, and The Conjuring likely emerged from early legends surrounding Robert the Doll, as well as from a Twilight Zone episode released five years prior to the Warrens' story, entitled "Living Doll", in which the character of the mother is named Annabelle. Laycock suggests that "the idea of demonically possessed dolls allows modern demonologists to find supernatural evil in the most banal and domestic of places."

Commenting on publicity for the Warrens' occult museum coinciding with the film release of The Conjuring, science writer Sharon A. Hill said that many of the myths and legends surrounding the Warrens have "seemingly been of their own doing" and that many people may have difficulty "separating the Warrens from their Hollywood portrayal". Hill criticized sensational press coverage of the Warrens' occult museum and its Annabelle doll. She said, "Like real-life Ed Warren, real-life Annabelle is actually far less impressive." Of the supernatural claims made about Annabelle by Ed Warren, Hill said, "We have nothing but Ed's word for this, and also for the history and origins of the objects in the museum."

The doll was also described in Gerald Brittle's 1980 biography of the Warrens, The Demonologist.

Character 
The Warrens' story of the doll served as inspiration for the Annabelle doll character depicted in The Conjuring Universe, a film series that includes the following: Annabelle (2014), Annabelle: Creation (2017), and Annabelle Comes Home (2019). The producers did not use the likeness of Raggedy Ann, partially due to potential trademark issues and partially to make the doll's appearance more unsettling for a horror film; its appearance has been described as a "terrifying porcelain doll that is disfigured and immediately menacing". The character makes its first appearance in James Wan The Conjuring (2013)  and additionally makes brief appearances in his sequel The Conjuring 2 (2016) and Michael Chaves's The Curse of La Llorona (2019) and The Conjuring: The Devil Made Me Do It (2021), as well as in the DC Extended Universe films Aquaman (2018) and Shazam! (2019), respectively directed by Wan and Annabelle: Creation director David F. Sandberg. The doll also appears in the trailer of the upcoming Shazam! Fury of the Gods, also directed by Sandberg.

See also 
Robert (doll)

References 

1970s toys
Haunted dolls
1970 introductions
Connecticut folklore
Supernatural legends
The Conjuring Universe
Raggedy Ann